Valerio Mastandrea (born 14 February 1972) is an Italian film, stage and television actor.

Life and career
He was born in Rome. While being a student of philosophy, in the early 1990s Mastandrea enjoyed some success thanks to the semi-regular participation in the Canale 5 late night talk show Maurizio Costanzo Show.

After some occasional participation in stage plays and films, he had his breakout with the role of Tarcisio in the 1995 crime film Palermo - Milan One Way by Claudio Fragasso. In 1997 he got his first leading role in the sleeper box office hit We All Fall Down.

Awards
Mastandrea won the David di Donatello for Best Actor for his role in The First Beautiful Thing in 2010.

In 2013, he won both the David di Donatello for Best Actor for his performance in Ivano De Matteo's Balancing Act and the David di Donatello for Best Supporting Actor for his role in Roberto Andò's Long Live Freedom.

Selected filmography

Film

 Palermo - Milan One Way (1995)
 A Cold, Cold Winter (1996)
 Growing Artichokes in Mimongo (1996)
 We All Fall Down (1997)
 Physical Jerks (1997)
 Viola Kisses Everybody (1998)
 The Scent of the Night (1998)
 La Carbonara (2000)
 Tomorrow (2001)
 Empty Eyes (2001)
 The Nest (2002)
 Maximum Velocity (V-Max) (2002)
 The Vanity Serum (2004)
 Working Slowly (Radio Alice) (2004)
 Sorry, You Can't Get Through! (2005)
 Napoleon and Me (2006)
 Last Minute Marocco (2007)
 Night Bus (2007)
 Non pensarci (2008)
 Your Whole Life Ahead of You (2008)
 Un giorno perfetto (2008)
Good Morning Aman (2009)
Giulia Doesn't Date at Night (2009)
 Nine (2009)
 The First Beautiful Thing (2010)
 Things from Another World (2011)
 All at Sea (2011)
 Padroni di casa (2012)
 Piazza Fontana: The Italian Conspiracy (2012)
 Balancing Act (2012)
 Garibaldi's Lovers (2012)
 Long Live Freedom (2013)
 The Chair of Happiness (2013)
 The Face of an Angel (2014)
 Pasolini (2014)
 The Complexity of Happiness (2015)
 Perfect Strangers (2016)
 Sweet Dreams (2016)
 Fiore (2016)
 The Place (2017)
 Troppa grazia (2018)
 Euphoria (2018)
 The King's Musketeers (2018)
 Domani è un altro giorno (2019)
 Diabolik (2021)
 Dry (2022)

TV
 Tear Along the Dotted Line (2021, TV series)

References

External links

1972 births
Living people
David di Donatello winners
Italian male film actors
Italian male television actors
Italian male stage actors
Male actors from Rome